Ishikawa Prefecture held a gubernatorial election on March 19, 2006. Incumbent Masanori Tanimoto won his fourth term. Tanimoto was backed by the Liberal Democratic Party, New Komeito Party, and the Social Democratic Party.

References 

2006 elections in Japan
Ishikawa gubernational elections
March 2006 events in Japan